Elliott Irving Organick (February 25, 1925 – December 21, 1985) was a computer scientist and pioneer in operating systems development and education. He was considered "the foremost expositor writer of computer science", and was instrumental in founding the ACM Special Interest Group for Computer Science Education.

Career
Organick described the Burroughs large systems in an ACM monograph of which he was the sole author, covering the work of Robert (Bob) Barton and others. He also wrote a monograph about the Multics timesharing operating system.  By the mid 1970s he had become "the foremost expositor writer of computer science"; he published 19 books.

He was editor of ACM Computing Surveys (ISSN 0360-0300) between 1973 and 1976.

In 1985 he received the ACM Special Interest Group on Computer Science Education Award for Outstanding Contribution to Computer Science Education.

He died of leukemia on December 21, 1985.

He taught at the University of Utah, where a Memorial Lecture series was established in his name.

Publications 

 The Multics System: An Examination of its Structure. MIT Press, 1972, . Still available from  the MIT Libraries  as a digital reprint (Laser-printed copy or PDF file of a scanned version.)
 Computer Systems Organization: The B5700/B6700. ACM Monograph Series, 1973. LCN: 72-88334

References

External links

1985 deaths
University of Utah faculty
1925 births
Manhattan Project people
Computer science educators
University of Michigan alumni
Deaths from leukemia
Massachusetts Institute of Technology people